Henry County is a county located in the U.S. state of Ohio. As of the 2020 census, the population was 27,662. Its county seat is Napoleon. The county was created in 1820 and later organized in 1834. It is named for American Founding Father Patrick Henry, the Virginian famous for his "give me liberty, or give me death!" speech.

Geography

Adjacent counties
Fulton County (north)
Lucas County (northeast)
Wood County (east)
Putnam County (south)
Defiance County (west)
Williams County (northwest)
Hancock County (southeast)

Demographics

2000 census
As of the census of 2000, there were 29,210 people, 10,935 households, and 7,960 families living in the county. The population density was 70 people per square mile (27/km2). There were 11,622 housing units at an average density of 28 per square mile (11/km2). The racial makeup of the county was 95.33% White, 0.58% Black or African American, 0.26% Native American, 0.42% Asian, 2.56% from other races, and 0.85% from two or more races. 5.40% of the population were Hispanic or Latino of any race. 94.3% spoke English, 3.7% Spanish and 1.7% German as their first language.

There were 10,935 households, out of which 35.20% had children under the age of 18 living with them, 61.10% were married couples living together, 8.10% had a female householder with no husband present, and 27.20% were non-families. 23.50% of all households were made up of individuals, and 10.40% had someone living alone who was 65 years of age or older. The average household size was 2.62 and the average family size was 3.10.

In the county, the population was spread out, with 27.60% under the age of 18, 8.20% from 18 to 24, 28.10% from 25 to 44, 22.10% from 45 to 64, and 14.00% who were 65 years of age or older. The median age was 36 years. For every 100 females there were 97.60 males. For every 100 females age 18 and over, there were 93.60 males.

The median income for a household in the county was $42,657, and the median income for a family was $49,881. Males had a median income of $35,901 versus $24,076 for females. The per capita income for the county was $18,667. About 5.30% of families and 7.00% of the population were below the poverty line, including 9.90% of those under age 18 and 4.20% of those age 65 or over.

2010 census
As of the 2010 United States Census, there were 28,215 people, 10,934 households, and 7,883 families living in the county. The racial makeup of the county was 95.2% white, 0.4% black or African American, 0.4% Asian, 0.3% American Indian, 2.4% from other races, and 1.3% from two or more races. Those of Hispanic or Latino origin made up 6.6% of the population. In terms of ancestry, 53.7% were German, 10.6% were Irish, 7.1% were English; 6.9% identified as "American".

Of the 10,934 households, 33.3% had children under the age of 18 living with them, 58.2% were married couples living together, 9.3% had a female householder with no husband present, 27.9% were non-families, and 23.7% of all households were made up of individuals. The average household size was 2.55 and the average family size was 2.99. The median age was 39.8 years.

The median income for a household in the county was $48,367 and the median income for a family was $58,587. Males had a median income of $44,953 versus $32,127 for females. The per capita income for the county was $22,638. About 8.0% of families and 10.6% of the population were below the poverty line, including 13.5% of those under age 18 and 5.9% of those age 65 or over.

Politics

|}

Government

Henry County has a three-member Board of County Commissioners that oversee the various county departments, similar to 85 of the other 88 Ohio counties.  The county commissioners are Jeff Mires, Glenn Miller, and Robert Hastedt.

Transportation

Airport
Henry County Airport is a public use airport located three nautical miles (6 km) east of the central business district of Napoleon, Ohio. It is owned by the Henry County Airport Authority.

Communities

City
Napoleon (county seat)

Villages

Deshler
Florida
Hamler
Holgate
Liberty Center
Malinta
McClure
New Bavaria

Townships

Bartlow
Damascus
Flatrock
Freedom
Harrison
Liberty
Marion
Monroe
Napoleon
Pleasant
Richfield
Ridgeville
Washington

https://web.archive.org/web/20160715023447/http://www.ohiotownships.org/township-websites

Census-designated place
Ridgeville Corners

Unincorporated communities
Colton
Elery
Gerald
Grelton
Okolona
Pleasant Bend
Texas

See also
National Register of Historic Places listings in Henry County, Ohio

References

External links
Henry County website
Henry County Engineer's website
Maumee Valley Heritage Corridor

 
1834 establishments in Ohio
Populated places established in 1834